Tobago West is a parliamentary electoral district in Trinidad and Tobago, comprising the western part of Tobago. It is currently represented by Shamfa Cudjoe.

This constituency was created by the Boundaries Commission prior to the 1961 Trinidad and Tobago general election. Although Tobago did not have a large enough voting population to justify the division, the Commission determined that it would be best represented by two Members of Parliament. This is reflected in Part IV, section 70 of the 1976 Constitution which requires Tobago to have at least two constituencies.

Members of Parliament 
This constituency has elected the following members of the House of Representatives of Trinidad and Tobago:

Election Results

Elections in the 2020s

Elections in the 2010s

References 

Constituencies of the Parliament of Trinidad and Tobago